Eskandar (Alexander) Shura Ossipoff is a former Assyrian boxer who represented Iran at the 1948 Summer Olympics. He participated in the light heavyweight division where he was defeated in the second round by the Italy's Di Segni.

See also
Boxing at the 1948 Summer Olympics

References

Assyrian sportspeople
Olympic boxers of Iran
Boxers at the 1948 Summer Olympics
Year of birth missing (living people)
Living people
Iranian Assyrian people
Iranian male boxers
Light-heavyweight boxers